

See also

Qualicum Beach.

Qualicum Beach
Regional District of Nanaimo